Lǐ Jiǒng (李迥) (750 – August 16, 796) was a Tang dynasty prince and Tang Daizong's seventh son. His mother was consort Dugu.

In 761 he was given the title Prince of Yanqing (延慶郡王) by his grandfather Tang Suzong.

Due to his mother's position as favorite consort of the emperor, Li Jiong was doted on.

In 762 Li Jiong received another title Prince of Han (韓王) from his father Daizong. In 775 he became a jiedushi inspector.

In the year of 796 Li Jiong died.

Tang dynasty imperial princes
750 births
796 deaths